The island leaf warbler (Phylloscopus poliocephalus) is a species of Old World warbler in the family Phylloscopidae.
It is found in an area ranging from the Moluccas to the Solomon Islands. It has 16 subspecies.

References

island leaf warbler
Birds of the Maluku Islands
Birds of New Guinea
Birds of the Bismarck Archipelago
Birds of the Solomon Islands
island leaf warbler
Taxonomy articles created by Polbot